Ericomyrtus is a genus of shrubs, in the family Myrtaceae, all of which are endemic to Australia.

Species include:
Ericomyrtus drummondii Turcz. 
Ericomyrtus parviflora (Turcz.) Rye 
Ericomyrtus serpyllifolia (Turcz.) Rye 
Ericomyrtus tenuior (Ewert) Rye

Distribution
Species within this genus are found in the south west of Western Australia.

References

 
Eudicots of Western Australia
Myrtaceae genera
Endemic flora of Southwest Australia
Taxa named by Nikolai Turczaninow